Hidewood Creek is a stream in the U.S. state of South Dakota.

Hidewood Creek was so named because Indians hid in the woods near it.

See also
List of rivers of South Dakota

References

Rivers of Deuel County, South Dakota
Rivers of Hamlin County, South Dakota
Rivers of South Dakota